Problematic smartphone use is proposed by some researchers to be a form of psychological or behavioral dependence on cell phones, closely related to other forms of digital media overuse such as social media addiction or internet addiction disorder. Other researchers have stated that terminology relating to behavioral addictions in regards to smartphone use can cause additional problems both in research and stigmatization of users, suggesting the term to evolve to problematic smartphone use. Problematic use can include preoccupation with mobile communication, excessive money or time spent on mobile phones, and use of mobile phones in socially or physically inappropriate situations such as driving an automobile. Increased use can also lead to adverse effects on relationships, mental or physical health, and ensues anxiety if separated from a mobile phone or sufficient signal. Preschool children and young adults are at highest risk for problematic smartphone use. 

The use of smartphone significantly increased since the late 2000s. In 2019 conducts, global smartphone users penetrated in 41.5% of total population. Due to prolific technological advance, the smartphone overuse continued to be a major threat in Asian countries such as China, with around 700 million users are registered in 2018. Digital media overuse is tangentially linked to ocular problems, especially in young age. It has been estimated that 49.8% (4.8 billion) of global population with digital media overuse would be affected with myopia by 2050.

History and terminology 
It is also known as smartphone overuse, smartphone addiction, mobile phone overuse, or cell phone dependency. Founded in current research on the adverse consequences of overusing technology, "mobile phone overuse" has been proposed as a subset of forms of "digital addiction", or "digital dependence", reflecting increasing trends of compulsive behaviour amongst users of technological devices. Researchers have variously termed these behaviours "smartphone addiction" and "problematic smartphone use", as well as referring to use of non-smartphone mobile devices (cell phones). Forms of technology addiction have been considered as diagnoses since the mid 1990s. Panova and Carbonell published a review in 2018 that specifically encouraged terminology of "problematic use" in regard to technology behaviours, rather than continuing research based on other behavioral addictions.

Unrestrained use of technological devices may affect developmental, social, mental and physical well-being and result in symptoms akin to other behavioral addictions. However, the Diagnostic and Statistical Manual of Mental Disorders has not formally codified smartphone overuse as a diagnosis. Gaming disorder has been recognised in the International Classification of Diseases (ICD-11). Varied, changing recommendations are in part due to the lack of well established evidence or expert consensus, the differing emphasis of the classification manuals, as well as difficulties utilising animal models for behavioral addictions.

Whilst published studies have shown associations between digital media use and mental health symptoms or diagnoses, causality has not been established, with nuances and caveats of researchers often misunderstood by the general public, or misrepresented by the media. A systematic review of reviews published in 2019 concluded that evidence, although of mainly low to moderate quality, showed an association of screen time with poorer psychological health including symptoms such as inattention, hyperactivity, low self esteem, and behavioral issues in childhood and adolescence. Several studies have shown that females are more likely to overuse social media, and males video games. This has led experts to suggest that digital media overuse may not be a unified phenomenon, with some calling to delineate proposed disorders based on individual online activity.

Due to the lack of recognition and consensus on the concepts, diagnoses and treatments are difficult to standardise or recommend, especially considering that "new media has been subject to such moral panic."

Prevalence

International estimates of the prevalence of forms of technology overuse have varied considerably, with marked variations by nation and increases over time.

Prevalence of mobile phone overuse depends largely on definition and thus the scales used to quantify a subject's behaviors. Two main scales are in use, the 20-item self-reported Problematic Use of Mobile Phones (PUMP) scale, and the Mobile Phone Problem Use Scale (MPPUS), which have been used both with adult and adolescent populations. There are variations in the age, gender, and percentage of the population affected problematically according to the scales and definitions used. The prevalence among British adolescents aged 11–14 was 10%. In India, addiction is stated at 39-44% for this age group. Under different diagnostic criteria, the estimated prevalence ranges from 0 to 38%, with self-attribution of mobile phone addiction exceeding the prevalence estimated in the studies themselves. The prevalence of the related problem of Internet addiction was 4.9-10.7% in Korea, and is now regarded as a serious public health issue. A questionnaire survey in Korea also found that these teenagers are twice as likely to admit that they are "mobile phone addicted" as adults. For most teenagers, smartphone communication is what they think is an important way to maintain social relationships and has become an important part of their lives. Additional scales used to measure smartphone addictions are the Korean Scale for Internet Addiction for adolescents (K-scale), the Smartphone Addiction Scale (SAS-SV), and the Smartphone Addiction Proneness Scale (SAPS). These implicit tests were validated as means of measuring smartphone and internet addiction in children and adolescents in a study conducted by Daeyoung Roh, Soo-Young Bhang, Jung-Seok Choi, Yong Sil Kweon, Sang-Kyu Lee and Marc N. Potenza.

Behaviors associated with mobile-phone addiction differ between genders. Older people are less likely to develop addictive mobile phone behavior because of different social usage, stress, and greater self-regulation. At the same time, the study by media regulator Ofcom has shown that 50% of 10-year-olds in the UK owned a smartphone in 2019. These children who grow with gadgets in their hands are more prone to mobile phone addiction, since their online and offline worlds merge into a single whole.

Effects

Overuse of mobile phones may be associated with negative outcomes on mental and physical health, in addition to having an impact on how users interact socially.

Social
Some people are replacing face-to-face conversations with cyber ones. Clinical psychologist Lisa Merlo says, "Some patients pretend to talk on the phone or fiddle with apps to avoid eye contact or other interactions at a party." Furthermore,

70% check their phones in the morning within an hour of getting up.
56% check their phones before going to bed.
48% check their phones over the weekend.
51% constantly check their phones during vacation.
44% reported they would feel very anxious and irritable if they did not interact with their phones within a week.

This change in style from face-to-face to text-based conversation has also been observed by Sherry Turkle. Her work cites connectivity as an important trigger of social behavior change regarding communication; therefore, this adaptation of communicating is not caused only by the phone itself. In her book, Alone Together: Why We Expect More from Technology and Less from Each Other, Turkle argues that people now find themselves in a state of "continual co-presence." This means that digital communication allows the occurrence of two or more realities in the same place and time. Subsequently, person also live in a "world of continual partial attention," the process of paying simultaneous attention to a number of sources of incoming information, but at a superficial level. Bombarded with an abundance of emails, texts, messages, people not only find themselves divesting people of their human characteristics or individuality, but also increasingly treating them as digital units. This is often referred to as depersonalization.

According to Elliot Berkman, a psychology professor at the University of Oregon, the constant checking of phones is caused by reward learning and the fear of missing out. Berkman explains that, “Habits are a product of reinforcement learning, one of our brain's most ancient and reliable systems,” and people tend, thus, to develop habits of completing behaviors that have rewarded them in the past. For many, using mobile phone has been enjoyable in the past, leading to feel excited and positive when receive a notification from phones. Berkman also iterates that people often check their smartphones to relieve the social pressure they place upon themselves to never miss out on exciting things. As Berkman says, "Smartphones can be an escape from boredom because they are a window into many worlds other than the one right in front of you, helping us feel included and involved in society." When people do not check their mobile phones, they are unable to satisfy this “check habit” or suppress the fear of missing out, leading to feel anxious and irritable. A survey conducted by Hejab M. Al Fawareh and Shaidah Jusoh also found that people also often feel incomplete without their smartphones. Of the 66 respondents, 61.41% strongly agreed or agreed with the statement, “I feel incomplete when my smartphone is not with me.”

Other implications of cell phone use in mental health symptoms were observed by Thomée et al. in Sweden. This study found a relationship between report of mental health and perceived stress of participants' accessibility, which is defined as the possibility to be disturbed at any moment of day or night.

Critics of smartphones have especially raised concerns about effects on youth. The presence of smartphones in everyday life may affect social interactions amongst teenagers. Present evidence shows that smartphones are not only decreasing face-to-face social interactions between teenagers, but are also making the youth less likely to talk to adults. In a study produced by Doctor Lelia Green at Edith Cowan University, researchers discovered that, “the growing use of mobile technologies implies a progressive digital colonization of children’s lives, reshaping the interactions of younger adults.” Face-to-face interactions have decreased because of the increase in shared interactions via social media, mobile video sharing, and digital instant messaging. Critics believe the primary concern in this shift is that the youth are inhibiting themselves of constructive social interactions and emotional practices. Engaging in a strictly digital world may isolate individuals, causing lack of social and emotional development.

Other studies show that there is actually a positive social aspect from smartphone use. A study on whether smartphone presence changed responses to social stress conducted an experiment with 148 males and females around the age of 20. Participants were split up into 3 groups where 1) phone was present and use was encouraged, 2) phone was present with use restricted, and 3) no phone access. They were exposed to a peer, social-exclusion stressor, and saliva samples measuring levels of alpha-amylase (sAA), or stressor hormones, were measured throughout. The results showed that both of the phone-present groups had lower levels of SAA and cortisol than the group without a phone, thus suggesting that the presence of a smartphone, even if it's not being used, can decrease the negative effects of social exclusion.

Health

Research from the London School of Hygiene & Tropical Medicine at Queen Mary in 2011 indicated that one in six cell phones is contaminated with fecal matter. Under further inspection, some of the phones with the fecal matter were also harboring lethal bacteria such as E. coli, which can result in fever, vomiting, and diarrhea.

According to the article Mobile Phones and Nosocomial Infections, written by researchers at Mansoura University of Egypt, it states that the risk of transmitting the bacteria by the medical staff (who carry their cellphones during their shift) is much higher because cellphones act as a reservoir where the bacteria can thrive.

Despite the International Agency for Research on Cancer of the World Health Organization stating in 2011 that radio frequency is a possible human carcinogen, based on heavy usage increasing the risk of developing glioma tumors, no relationship has been established. In fact, there is no definitive evidence linking cancer and phone use, nor any accepted scientific explanation for how phone usage could cause cancer. Despite this, research is continuing based on leads from changing patterns of mobile phone use over time and habits of phone users, and there been claims that low-level radio frequency radiation promotes tumors in mice.

Studies show that some users associate mobile phone usage with headaches, impaired memory and concentration, fatigue, dizziness and disturbed sleep. Claims that users have developed electrosensitivity from excessive exposure to electromagnetic fields are likely psychological in origin due to the nocebo effect. Minor acute immediate effects of radio frequency exposure have long been known such as the Microwave auditory effect which was discovered in 1962.

A study by scientists from the Karolinska Institute and Uppsala University in Sweden and from Wayne State University in Michigan founded that using a cell phone before bed can cause insomnia. The study showed that this is due to the radiation received by the user as stated, "The study indicates that during laboratory exposure to 884 MHz wireless signals, components of sleep believed to be important for recovery from daily wear and tear are adversely affected." Additional adverse health effects attributable to smartphone usage include a diminished quantity and quality of sleep due to an inhibited secretion of melatonin.Adolescents who spent time online before bedtime had higher rates of Internet addiction and insomnia than those who did not spend time online before bedtime.

In 2014, 58% of World Health Organization states advised the general population to reduce radio frequency exposure below heating guidelines. The most common advice is to use hands-free kits (69%), to reduce call time (44%), use text messaging (36%), avoid calling with low signals (24%) or use phones with low specific absorption rate (SAR) (22%). In 2015 Taiwan banned toddlers under the age of two from using mobile phones or any similar electronic devices, and France banned Wi-Fi from toddlers' nurseries.

As the market increases to grow, more light is being shed upon the accompanying behavioral health issues and how mobile phones can be problematic. Mobile phones continue to become increasingly multifunctional and sophisticated, which this in turn worsens the problem.

According to optician Andy Hepworth, blue violet light, a light that is transmitted from the cell phone into the eye is potentially hazardous and can be "toxic" to the back of the eye. He states that an over exposure to blue violet light can lead to a greater risk of macular degeneration which is a leading cause of blindness.

Psychological

There are concerns that some mobile phone users incur considerable debt, and that mobile phones are being used to violate privacy and harass others. In particular, there is increasing evidence that mobile phones are being used as a tool by children to bully other children.

There is a large amount of research on mobile phone use, and its positive and negative influence on the human's psychological mind, mental health and social communication. Mobile phone users may encounter stress, sleep disturbances and symptoms of depression, especially young adults. Consistent phone use can cause a chain reaction, affecting one aspect of a user's life and expanding to contaminate the rest. It usually starts with social disorders, which can lead to depression and stress and ultimately affect lifestyle habits such as sleeping right and eating right.

According to research done by Professor of psychology at San Diego State University Jean M. Twenge, there is a correlation between mobile phone overuse and depression. In the wake of smartphone being evolved, Twenge and her colleagues stated that there was also an increase seen in depressive symptoms and even suicides among adolescents in 2010. The theory behind this research is that adolescents who are being raised as a generation of avid smartphone users are spending so much time on these devices that they forgo actual human interaction which is seen as essential to mental health, "The more time teens spend looking at screens, the more likely they are to report symptoms of depression." While children used to spend their free time outdoors with others, with the advancement of technology, this free time is seemingly now being spent more on mobile devices.

In this research, Twenge also discusses that, three out of four American teens owned an iPhone and with this rates of teen depression and suicide have skyrocketed since 2011 which follows the release of the iPhone in 2007 and the iPad in 2010. Another focus is that teens now spend the majority of their leisure time on their phones. This leisure time can be seen as detrimental which can be seen through eighth-graders who spend 10 or more hours a week on social media are 56% more likely to be unhappy than those who devote less time to social media.

Psychologist Nancy Colier has argued that people have lost sight of what is truly important to them in life. She says that people have become "disconnected from what really matters, from what makes us feel nourished and grounded as human beings." People's addiction to technology has deterred neurological and relationship development because tech is being introduced to people at a very young age. People have become so addicted to their phones that they are almost dependent on them. Humans are not meant to be constantly staring at a screen as time is needed to relax their eyes and more importantly their minds. Colier states: "Without open spaces and downtime, the nervous system never shuts down—it's in constant fight-or-flight mode. We're wired and tired all the time. Even computers reboot, but we’re not doing it."

The amount of time spent on screens appears to have a correlation with happiness levels. A nationally representative study of American 12th graders funded by the National Institute on Drug Abuse titled Monitoring the Future Survey found that “teens who spent more time than average on screen activities are more likely to be unhappy, and those who spend more time than average on non-screen activities are more likely to be happy.” One of the most important findings of this study is how the amount of time spent on non screen activities versus on screen activities affects the happiness levels of teenagers.

However, while it is easy to see a correlation between cell phone overuse and these symptoms of depression, anxiety, and isolation, it is much harder to prove that cell phones themselves cause these issues. Studies of correlations cannot prove causation because there are multiple other factors that increase depression in people today. According to psychologist Peter Etchells, although parents and other figures share these concerns other possible variables must be reviewed as well. Etchells proposes two possible alternative theories: depression could cause teens to use iPhones more or teens could be more open to discussing the topic of depression in this day and age.

A survey done by a group of independent opticians reviled that 43% of people under the age of 25 experienced anxiety or even irritation when they were not able to access their phone whenever they wanted. This survey shows the psychological effect that cell phones have on people, specifically young people.

Smartphone dependence is also associated with increased number of phantom phone signals, as in Phantom vibration syndrome.

Neural
There has been considerable speculation about the impact problematic mobile usage may have on cognitive development and how such habits could be ‘rewiring’ the brains of those highly engaged with their mobiles. Research has shown that the reward areas of the brains of those who use their phones more exhibit different structural connectivity than those who use their phones less. Further findings have linked digital media behaviors to the brain's self-regulatory control structures, suggesting that variation in individuals' ability to control behavioral impulses might also be a key psychological pathway connecting mobile technology habits to the brain.

Distracted driving 

 
Research has found that there is a direct relationship between mobile phone overuse and mobile phone use while driving. Mobile phone overuse can be especially dangerous in certain situations such as texting/browsing and driving or talking on the phone while driving. Over 8 people are killed and 1,161 are injured daily because of distracted driving. At any given daylight moment across U.S., approximately 660,000 drivers are using cell phones or electronic devices while driving. The significant number of injuries and accidents from distracted driving can be contributed at least partially to mobile phone overuse. However, many cell phone-related crashes are not reported due to drivers' reluctance to admit texting or talking behind the wheel. There is currently no national ban on texting while driving, but many states have implemented laws to try to prevent these accidents.

Sixteen states as well as Washington D.C., Puerto Rico, and the U.S. Virgin Islands passed laws prohibiting the use of hand-held devices while driving. Texting and driving is banned in most of the country; new drivers in 38 states and DC are not permitted to use cell phones behind the wheel. According to the National Highway Traffic Safety Administration, or NHTSA (which promotes safe driving through research and education), drivers between the ages of 16 and 24 were most distracted, with women at greater risk of dying in a crash. About 20,000 of motor vehicle fatalities between 2012 and 2017 were related to distracted driving.

In the UK, the only way to currently use a mobile phone lawfully whilst driving is using a hands-free system. Any other type of phone use whilst in control of a vehicle, whether stationary or moving, carries a fine of £1, 000 and 6 penalty points. This can be increased for serious misuse. 1 in 5 of UK residents admit to checking social media whilst being behind the wheel. It's interesting to note that in the UK, it is also illegal for someone accompanying a learner driver to use their mobile phone whilst driving. As an instructor, they are classed as in control of the vehicle, even if they are not a professional instructor.

A text can take one's eyes off the road for an average of five seconds. Although brief, one driving at 55 mph can travel the length of a football field in that time. Approximately three percent of drivers are talking on the phone when stopped at an intersection. Furthermore, five percent of drivers are on the phone at any given time. The Insurance Institute of Highway Safety (IIHS) reported those who used cell phones more often tended to brake harder, drive faster, and change lanes more frequently, predisposing them to crashes and near-crashes. They are also two to six times more likely to get into an accident.

Research indicates driver performance is adversely affected by concurrent cell phone use, delaying reaction time and increasing lane deviations and length of time with eyes off the road. It can also cause "inattention blindness," in which drivers see but do not register what is in front of them.

Teen drivers are especially at risk. About 1.2 million and 341,000 crashes in 2013 involved talking and texting, respectively. Distractions such as music, games, GPS, social media, etc., are potentially deadly when combined with inexperience. The dangers of driving and multitasking continue to rise as more technology is integrated into cars. Teens who texted more frequently were less likely to wear a seat belt and more likely to drive intoxicated or ride with a drunk driver. Cell phone use can reduce brain activity as much as 37%, affecting young drivers' abilities to control their vehicles, pay attention to the roadway, and respond promptly to traffic events.

Tools to prevent or treat mobile phone overuse
The following tools or interventions can be used to prevent or treat mobile phone overuse.

Behavioral 
Many studies have found relationships between psychological or mental health issues and smartphone addiction. Hence, behavioral interventions such as individual or family psychotherapy for these issues may help. In fact, studies have found that psychotherapeutic approaches such as cognitive behavioral therapy and motivational interviewing are able to successfully treat internet addiction and may be useful for mobile phone overuse. Further, support groups and family therapy may also help prevent and treat internet and smartphone addiction.

Complete abstinence from mobile phone use or abstinence from certain apps can also help treat mobile phone overuse. Other behavioral interventions include practicing the opposite (e.g. disrupt their normal routine and re-adapt to new time patterns of use), goal-setting, reminder cards (e.g. listing 5 problems resulting from mobile phone overuse and 5 benefits of limiting overuse), and creating a personal inventory of alternative activities (e.g. exercise, music, art).

In 2019 the World Health Organization issued recommendations about active lifestyle, sleep and screen time for children at age 0–5. The recommendations are:

For children in age less than one year: 30 minute physical activity, 0 hours screen time and 14 – 17 hours of sleep time per day.

For children in age 1 year: 180 minutes physical activity, 0 hours screen time, 11–14 hours of sleep time per day.

For children in age 2 year: 180 minutes physical activity, 1 hour screen time, 11–14 hours of sleep time per day.

For 3-4-year-old children: 180 minutes physical activity, 1 hour screen time, 10–13 hours of sleep time per day.

Phone settings 
Many smartphone addiction activists (such as Tristan Harris) recommend turning one's phone screen to grayscale mode, which helps reduce time spent on mobile phones by making them boring to look at. Other phone settings alterations for mobile phone non-use included turning on airplane mode, turning off cellular data and/or Wi-Fi, turning off the phone, removing specific apps, and factory resetting.

Phone apps 
German psychotherapist and online addiction expert Bert te Wildt recommends using apps such as Offtime and Menthal to help prevent mobile phone overuse. In fact, there are many apps available on Android and iOS stores which help track mobile usage. For example, in iOS 12 Apple added a function called "Screen Time" that allows users to see how much time they have spent on the phone. In Android a similar feature called "digital wellbeing" has been implemented to keep track of cell phone usage. These apps usually work by doing one of two things: increasing awareness by sending user usage summaries, or notifying the user when he/she has exceeded some user-defined time-limit for each app or app category.

Research-based 
Studying and developing interventions for temporary mobile phone non-use is a growing area of research. Hiniker et al. generated 100 different design ideas for mobile phone non-use belonging to eight organic categories: information (i.e. agnostically providing information to the user about his or her behavior), reward (i.e. rewarding the user for engaging in behaviors that are consistent with his or her self-defined goals), punishment (i.e. punishing the user for engaging in behaviors that are inconsistent with his or her self-defined goals), disruption (i.e. a temporary barrier momentarily prevents the user from engaging in a specific behavior), limit (i.e. certain behaviors are time or context-bound or otherwise constrained within defined parameters), mindfulness (i.e. the user is asked to reflect on his or her choices, before, during or after making them), appeal to values (i.e. reminding the user about the underlying values that shaped his or her decisions about de- sired use and non-use), social support (i.e. opportunities for including other individuals into the intervention). 

Users found interventions related to information, limit, and mindfulness to be the most useful. The researchers implement an Android app that combined these three intervention types and found that users reduced their time with the apps they feel are a poor use of time by 21% while their use of the apps they feel are a good use of time remained unchanged.

AppDetox allows users to define rules that limit their usage of specific apps. PreventDark detects and prevents problematic usage of smartphones in the dark. Using vibrations instead of notifications to limit app usage has also been found to be effective. Further, researchers have found group-based interventions that rely on users sharing their limiting behaviors with others to be effective.
An experimental research demonstrate that mobile media education (in particular time and attention management) reduces problematic smartphone use and increases wellbeing among high school students

Bans on mobile phone use 

In some places in the world the use of mobile phones was banned in classes during instructional time, for example, in France, Ontario. Research says it improves the performance of students.

Psychological symptoms of phone usage 
The psychological symptoms that people who are addicted to smartphones possession are depression, social isolation, low self-esteem and anxiety. Three types of disorders classified as follows: (1) Depression is a medical illness that adversely influences people in emotion, imagination, and action. It is the common word related to the mental problem accredited by clinical psychologists. It is the symptom that people possess a lot offline, however, the number of people gets in online these days. (2) Social isolation—the lack of interaction between individuals and society. If the communications are just done by the message on the phone, the conversation with face-to-face would no longer happen and the offline real-life friends would not be made or resisted anymore. People may think they are happy and satisfying their life, however, only online. Therefore, they would end up people feeling lonely and isolated from the world when they are in real life. (3) low self-esteem and anxiety are a lack of confidence and feeling negative about oneself. People check the reaction to their posts and care about likes, comments, and other's post, which decreases self-esteem. These connect to anxiety; caring other's reaction to show off themselves, checking phone frequently with no reason.
It has been acknowledged that problematic smartphone use affects quality of life (QOL) parameters. For example, it was found that the user awareness mode while using the device affects the QOL parameters in various ways.

Depression 
Depressive symptoms, in particular, are some of the most serious psychological problems in adolescents; the relationship between depressive symptoms and mobile phone addiction is a critical issue because such symptoms may lead to substance abuse, school failure, and even suicide.

Isolation 
The increase of mobile phone addiction levels would increase user's social isolation from a decrease of face-to-face social interactions, then users would face much more interpersonal problems. The phone stops the conversation and interaction between humans. The process of smartphone overuse may negatively affects social support and undermines user's psychological health. Some indirect evidence also exist. For example, Lemmens, Valkenburg, and Peter (2011) founded that behavioral addiction (i.e. gambling) with mobile phone overuse may leads to loneliness, causing conflict with family or friends, and potentially reducing social support.

Low self-esteem and anxiety 
The other psychological symptoms that are caused by phone addiction are self-esteem and anxiety. Today, Social Network Service (SNS) is one of the main streams in the world, therefore it dissolved a lot in daily life too. Studies with teens have consistently shown that there are significant relationships between high extroversion, high anxiety, low self-esteem, and mobile phone usage. The stronger the young person's mobile phone addiction, the more likely that individual is to have high mobile phone call time, receive excessive calls, and receive excessive text messages.

Anxious people more easily perceive certain normal life matters as pressure. To reduce this stress might result in even more addictive behaviors and females are more likely to use mobile phones to maintain social relations.

See also 

Computer addiction
De Quervain syndrome
Digital detox, a period of time during which a person refrains from using electronic connecting devices
Digital media use and mental health
Instagram's impact on people
Internet addiction disorder

Mobile phone radiation and health
Nomophobia, a proposed name for the fear of being out of cellular phone contact
Smartphones and pedestrian safety
Television addiction
Video game overuse

References

Further reading

 

 Krajewska-Kulak, E., et al. Problematic mobile phone using among the Polish and Belarusian University students, a comparative study. Progress in Health Sciences 2.1 (2012): 45+. Academic OneFile database. 4 December 2012. 
 Gil Brand, Making Smart Use of the Smartphone, 14 February 2017.

External links

Digital media use and mental health
Addiction
Overuse
Substance dependence
Mobile phone culture